The Dzala language, also called Dzalakha, Dzalamat, or Yangtsebikha, is an East Bodish language spoken in eastern Bhutan, in the Lhuntse and Trashiyangtse Districts.

References

Bibliography

External links 
 Himalayan Languages Project

Languages of Bhutan
East Bodish languages